Jebel Ali is a port town  south-west of Dubai. The Jebel Ali Port is located there. Al Maktoum International Airport has been constructed just outside the port area. Jebel Ali is connected to Dubai via the UAE Exchange (formerly Jebel Ali), Danube (formerly Jebel Ali Industrial) and Energy stations on the Dubai Metro. Among the infrastructure projects built to support the port and town is the world's largest desalination plant, the Jebel Ali Desalination Plant (Phase 2), providing an ample supply of freshwater.

History
Many Arab historians argue that it was named after Ali, who was the cousin and son-in-law of Muhammad while expanding the Islamic Caliphate had stood on one hill and looked towards the sea and perhaps known as well although no such recorded proof has been found. "Jebel" means mountain or hill in Arabic.

In 1968, Overseas AST started construction of Dubai's first Communications Station in the Jebal Ali area, because of the raised ground. It was commissioned in 1970, giving for the first time telecommunication links with the rest of the world. In the 1970s, Sheikh Rashid bin Saeed Al Maktoum planned to develop Jebel Ali into an industrial area with its own airport, port, and township.

On 23 September 1983, Gulf Air Flight 771 crashed in Jebel Ali killing all 112 people on board. The cause of the crash was a terrorist bomb that had been planted onboard the aircraft by the Abu Nidal Organization.

Jebel Ali Free Zone

In 1985, the Jebel Ali Free Zone (JAFZA) was created: an industrial area surrounding the port. International companies that relocate there enjoy the special privileges of the free zone. These include exemption from corporate tax for 50 years, no personal income tax, no import or re-export duties, no restriction on currency, and easy labor supply and recruitment from authorized companies.

Jebel Ali Industrial Area
Jebel Ali Industrial Area (aka Jebel Ali Industrial) is one of Dubai's oldest industrial districts. It is located east of the Port of Jebel Ali, south of Jebel Ali Village, west of Dubai Investments Park, and north of the Jebel Ali Free Zone Extension. There have been a number of industrial fires in the area.

Port of Jebel Ali

Jebel Ali has become the port most frequently visited by ships of the United States Navy outside the United States. Due to the frequency of these port visits, semi-permanent shore-leave facilities (referred to by US Navy service personnel as "The Sandbox") have been erected adjacent to the carrier berth.

Jebel Ali Village

The original Jebel Ali Village (JAV) was constructed in 1977 to provide accommodation to construction contractors' staff involved with the development of Jebel Ali. Jebel Ali Village was effectively a small British-style garden city. It was a project of Sir William Halcrow and Partners and acted as a prototype for further semi-autonomous residential areas in Dubai such as Emirates Hills and The Gardens. Construction for the redevelopment of Jebel Ali village began by 2008. More recently in 2021, it was announced that the previously isolated Jebel Ali Village was to be transformed to make way for luxury villas by Nakheel Properties.

Churches Complex 
The Churches Complex in Jebel Ali Village, is an area for a number of churches and temples of different religious denominations, especially Christian denominations.

Churches and temples in the complex include:

 St Francis of Assisi Catholic Church
 Christ Church Jebel Ali Anglican Church.
 Dubai Evangelical Church Centre (DECC)
 St Mina Copts Orthodox Church
 The Mar Thoma Parish church
 Mor Ignatius Jacobite Syrian Orthodox Cathedral
 Archdiocese Of Roum Orthodox Church
 Gurunanak Darbar Dubai Sikh Temple
Hindu Temple, Jebel Ali

Palm Jebel Ali

Palm Jebel Ali is an artificially made archipelago in Jebel Ali which began construction in October 2002, was originally planned to be completed by mid-2008, and has been on hold since.

See also
 
 Jebel Ali Seaplane Base
 Jebel Ali refinery
 Jabal Ali (Dubai Metro)

References

External links

 

Cities in the United Arab Emirates
Populated places in Dubai